Hoodoo Peak is a  mountain summit located in Park County, Wyoming, United States.

Description 
This remote peak is situated along the common border shared by Yellowstone National Park and North Absaroka Wilderness, and it ranks as the 24th-highest peak in the park. It is part of the Absaroka Range which is a subset of Rocky Mountains. From the summit one can see 30 miles north to Granite Peak which is the highest point in Montana, and as far south as the Tetons, 80 miles distant.

History
Prospectors named Hoodoo Basin, below the southern slopes of the peak, which refers to geologic formations called hoodoos found there. When Philetus Norris, the second superintendent of Yellowstone Park, climbed the peak in 1880, he took note of the hoodoos. In his report he used an aneroid barometer to measure the summit elevation to be 10,700 feet and wrote: "Here, extending from 500 to 1,500 below the summit, the frosts and storms of untold ages in an Alpine climate have worn about a dozen labyrinths of countless deep, narrow, tortuous channels amid the long, slender, tottering pillars, shafts, and spires of the conglomerate breccia and other remaining volcanic rocks. Here the sharp-cornered fragments of rocks of nearly every size, form, formation, and shade of coloring, by a peculiar volcanic cement attached sidewise, endwise, and upon the tops, sides, and, apparently, unsupported, upon each other, represent every form, garb, and posture of gigantic human beings, as well as of birds, beasts, and reptiles. In fact, nearly every form, animate or inanimate, real or chimerical, ever actually seen or conjured by the imagination, may here be observed." The mountain has also been known as Goblin Peak, but the mountain's hoodoo name was officially adopted in 1895 by the United States Board on Geographic Names.

Climate 
According to the Köppen climate classification system, Hoodoo Peak is located in an alpine subarctic climate zone with long, cold, snowy winters, and cool to mild summers. Winter temperatures can drop below −10 °F with wind chill factors below −30 °F. Precipitation runoff from the mountain drains west into headwaters of the Lamar River, and east into tributaries of the Clarks Fork Yellowstone River.

Gallery

See also
 List of mountains and mountain ranges of Yellowstone National Park

References

External links
 Weather forecast: Hoodoo Peak

Mountains of Park County, Wyoming
Mountains of Wyoming
North American 3000 m summits
Mountains of Yellowstone National Park
Shoshone National Forest